Elmore Wallace Hurst (December 6, 1851 – July 21, 1915) was a Democrat in the Illinois House of Representatives in 1888 and again in 1898.

Biography
Hurst was born on December 6, 1851, in Rock Island, Illinois to William and Anna (Hurlock) Hurst. William and Ann were from Delaware. William Hurst moved to Rock Island in 1837, and was a merchant. On May 29, 1873 he married Harriet M. Fieldand they lived on the corner of Nineteenth Street and Sixth Avenue in Rock Island, Illinois. He died on July 21, 1915 at his home in Rock Island, Illinois.

References

Politicians from Rock Island, Illinois
1851 births
1915 deaths
Members of the Illinois House of Representatives
19th-century American politicians